Manju Kapur is an Indian novelist. Her first novel, Difficult Daughters, won the 1999 Commonwealth Writers' Prize, best first book, Europe and South Asia.

Personal life
She is married to Gun Nidhi Dalmia; they have three children and four grandchildren, and live in New Delhi.

Awards and honors
2011: DSC Prize for South Asian Literature, short-list, The Immigrant
1999: Commonwealth Writers' Prize, best first book, Europe and South Asia, Difficult Daughters

Works
Difficult Daughters, Penguin India, 1998; Faber and Faber, 1998,  
A Married Woman, India Ink, 2003; Faber and Faber, 2003,  
Home, Random House India, 2006, ; Faber and Faber, 2006,  
The Immigrant, Random House, India, 2008, ; Faber And Faber, 2009,  
Custody, Faber & Faber, 2011, 
Shaping the World: Women Writers on Themselves, ed. Manju Kapur, Hay House India, 2014.
Brothers, Penguin, UK, 2016.

Television adaptations

Manju Kapur's novel "Custody" has been the basis of daily soap operas on several Indian television channels in various languages:

 Yeh Hai Mohabbatein on Star Plus in Hindi under Ekta Kapoor's production house Balaji Telefilms.
 Nakalat Saare Ghadle on Star Pravah in Marathi under Swapnil Joshi Productios.
 Pranayam on Asianet in Malayalam under Sree Saran Productions.
 Kalyanam Mudhal Kadhal Varai on Star Vijay in Tamil.
 Avanu Mathe Shravani on Asianet Suvarna in Kannada.
 Manasupalik Mouna Geetham on Maa in Telugu.
 Mon Niye Kachakachi on Star Jalsha in Bengali.

Pardes Mein Hai Mera Dil, telecast on Star Plus, under Ekta Kapoor's production house Balaji Telefilms, is based on Manju Kapur's novel "The Immigrant".

The Married Woman, is a web series, under Ekta Kapoor's production and is available on AltBalaji, it is based on Manju Kapur's novel "A Married Woman".

Reviews

See also
 List of Indian writers

References

Further reading
Nitonde, Rohidas. In Search of a Feminist Writer, PartridgeIndia, Bloomington, 2014.http://www.flipkart.com/search?q=rohidas+nitonde&as=on&as-show=on&otracker=start&as-pos=1_q https://www.amazon.in/Search-Feminist-Writer-Rohidas-Nitonde/dp/1482833913/ref=la_B00O66VNAK_1_1?s=books&ie=UTF8&qid=1443238147&sr=1-1
Nitonde, Rohidas. Manju Kapur Bibliography, Google Play Book, 2015. https://www.researchgate.net/publication/267928118_Manju_Kapur_A_Bibliography
Askok Kumar, ed., Novels of Manju Kapur: A Feministic Study, Sarup and Sons, New Delhi,2010.
Ram Sharma, Rise New Woman: Novels of Manju Kapur, Manglam Publications, Delhi, 2013.
Kalpana Rajput, Remapping the Female Map: Jhumpa Lahiri and Manju Kapur, Yking Books, Jaipur, 2012.

External links
"A meeting with Manju Kapur", Jabberwock, 9 August 2008
"Manju Kapur", Sawnet
Miranda House Faculty
Amba Dalmia Center named in honour of the late daughter of Manju Kapur
"Family Portraits" Telegraph India, Sunday, 21 September 2008
"Internationalizing the University"
"Official Website"

1948 births
Living people
Punjabi people
20th-century Indian novelists
Indian women novelists
21st-century Indian novelists
Novelists from Punjab, India
Writers from Amritsar
20th-century Indian women writers
21st-century Indian women writers
Women writers from Punjab, India
Women writers from Delhi